Thomas or Tom Franklin may refer to:
 Thomas E. Franklin (born 1966), American photographer
 Thomas E. Franklin (lawyer) (1810–1884), Pennsylvania lawyer and attorney general
 Tom Franklin (poker player) (born 1950), American professional poker player
 Tom Franklin (author) (born 1962), American crime fiction writer
 Tom Franklin (rugby union) (born 1990), New Zealand rugby union player

See also 
 Thomas Francklin (1721–1784), English academic, clergyman, writer and dramatist
 Franklin Thomas (disambiguation)